William Shepard Bryan (November 20, 1827 – December 9, 1906) was a Maryland lawyer who served as a justice of the Maryland Court of Appeals from 1883 to 1898.

Early life, education, and career
Born in New Bern, North Carolina, he was the son of Congressman John Heritage Bryan. Bryan "received his early general and education in the South". He graduated from the University of North Carolina and read law under the supervision of his father. He moved to Baltimore in 1850, and read law to gain admission to the bar in Maryland in 1851, thereafter entering the practice of law. He was a southern sympathizer during the American Civil War, and was a presidential elector in the 1876 United States presidential election.

Judicial service
In 1883, Bryan was elected as a Democrat to the Baltimore seat on the court of appeals vacated by the resignation of Judge James Lawrence Bartol. As the only judge with no circuit duties to perform, he "delivered the opinion of the court in a large number of cases, many of them being of great importance and public interest". He retired from the court in 1898.

Personal life and death
On October 1, 1857, Bryan married Elizabeth "Lizzie" Edmondson Hayward of Talbot County, Maryland, with whom he had a daughter and three sons. Bryan's wife died in 1898. Bryan himself died of liver cancer eight years later, at the age of 79, at the home of his son, William Shepard Bryan Jr., who was then attorney general of the state. He was interred in Baltimore's Green Mount Cemetery.

References

1827 births
1906 deaths
People from New Bern, North Carolina
University of North Carolina alumni
U.S. state supreme court judges admitted to the practice of law by reading law
Judges of the Maryland Court of Appeals
Maryland Democrats